"Sin" is the third single by American artist Nine Inch Nails from the album Pretty Hate Machine. Released in October 1990, the song peaked at number 35 in the UK Singles Chart.

"Sin" has been commonly a staple of Nine Inch Nails live performances for many years; setlist.fm lists it as the band's ninth most played live song. Its versions on the single differentiate heavily from the album cut, with more an EBM sound with distorted vocals and alternate instrumentation that became the foundation for its many live renditions, as opposed to the synth-pop style featured on Pretty Hate Machine.

Single 
Stylized as 5in, it is the fourth official Nine Inch Nails release and final single for Pretty Hate Machine, containing three variations of the track and Nine Inch Nails' first cover song. The spine of the US version refers to the single as "Sin Long, Dub & Short". The lyric "Stale incense, old sweat, and lies..." directly quotes the short story "In the Hills, the Cities" by Clive Barker, from Books of Blood. All three versions were produced by Keith LeBlanc and Adrian Sherwood of Tackhead.

"Get Down, Make Love" is a cover of the Queen song originally released on News of the World.  This version of "Get Down, Make Love" samples Dan O'Herlihy from The Cabinet of Caligari, as well as a brief snippet of "We Will Rock You" in the final seconds. It was co-produced by Al Jourgensen of Ministry under the alias of Hypo Luxa and was later released again as a bonus track on the 2010 remaster of Pretty Hate Machine.

The single was included in the Record Store Day–Black Friday exclusive box set, Halo I–IV.

Music video 

A music video, directed by Brett Turnbull and produced by Sarah Bayliss was released, using the "(short)" remix of the song. It features two girls dancing with each other at the beginning, cutting to a black-and-white footage of a woman, naked except for what looks like straps to spelunking gear and a halogen lamp, walking a wrist-bound Trent Reznor with a bag over his head through what looks like an industrial warehouse complex and eventually to strap him into an Aerotrim where she spins him throughout the video. These scenes are intercut with two young gay lovers, a man and woman wearing ritualistic dressings and dancing, as well as visuals of a pierced phallus and clitoris, all reflecting the song's dark, sexual aspects.

Though the video never aired, an edited version appears on Closure. The original video later became available through TVT's website.

Track listing

US version

UK version

References 

1990 singles
1989 songs
Nine Inch Nails songs
TVT Records singles
Songs written by Trent Reznor
Song recordings produced by Keith LeBlanc
Song recordings produced by Adrian Sherwood
Island Records singles
Get Down, Make Love (Nine Inch Nails song)